The Bohemians or Bohemian Slavs (Bohemos Slavos, Boemanos Sclavos), were an early Slavic tribe in Bohemia (modern Czech Republic). Their land became recognized as the Duchy of Bohemia around 870.

History
The Slavs arrived in Bohemia in the 6th century after it having been vacated by the westward movement of Germanic tribes during the Migration Period. According to historian Dušan Třeštík, they advanced through the Moravian Gate (Moravská brána) valley and in the year 530 moved into Eastern Bohemia, along the rivers Labe (Elbe) and Vltava (Moldau) further into Central Bohemia. Many historians support the theory of a further wave of Slavs coming from the south during the first half of the 7th century. They fought with neighboring Avars until the coming of Samo.

In 805, Charles the Younger, the son of Charlemagne, was sent to fight the Bohemians, who were ruled by Lech.

The late 9th-century Bavarian Geographer mentions them as Beheimare, having 15 civitates.

Aftermath
Bořivoj was the first historically documented Duke of Bohemia from about 870 and progenitor of the Přemyslid dynasty. 

Cosmas of Prague's (1045–1125) Chronicle of Bohemians (1119), describes the legendary foundation of the Bohemian state by the earliest Bohemians around the year 600 (Duke Bohemus, Duke  Krok and his three daughters), Duchess Libuše and the foundation of Přemyslid dynasty by her marriage with Přemysl, old bloody wars, Duke Bořivoj and the introduction of Christianity in Bohemia, Saint Wenceslaus and his grandmother Saint Ludmila, reign of the three Boleslavs, the life of Saint Adalbert and bloody wars after year 1000.

See also
Moravians (tribe)

References

West Slavic tribes
9th century in Bohemia